Argyroupoli is an intermediate station on Athens Metro Line 2. It opened with the Elliniko extension on 26 July 2013. The station is adjacent to Vouliagmenis Avenue.

References

Athens Metro stations
Elliniko-Argyroupoli
Railway stations opened in 2013
2013 establishments in Greece